Hortense Raky (August 27, 1918 - September 25, 2006) was a German-born Austrian stage actress. She also starred in several films including Willi Forst's Court Theatre in 1936. Partly Jewish, she fled from Austria after the Anschluss of 1938 and settled in Switzerland. She returned to Vienna after the Second World War, but was at one point blacklisted due to her links with the Communist Eastern Bloc. At one point she appeared on stage in East Berlin during this era.

She was married to the actor Karl Paryla in 1939. They had two children who also became actors.

Selected filmography
 Court Theatre (1936)
 Women's Paradise (1936)
 Roxy and the Wonderteam (1938)
 Gasparone (1956)

References

Bibliography
 Robert Dassanowsky. World Film Locations: Vienna. Intellect Books, 2012.
Oliver Rathkolb. The Paradoxical Republic: Austria 1945–2005. Berghahn Books, 2010.

External links

1918 births
2006 deaths
Austrian film actresses
Austrian stage actresses
German stage actresses
German film actresses
Actresses from Berlin
Jewish emigrants from Austria after the Anschluss
20th-century German women